Battle of Tapae may refer to:
First Battle of Tapae, between Domitian and Dacians in 87 winning the Dacians
Second Battle of Tapae, between Decebal and Lucius Tettius Julianus in 88 winning the Romans
Third Battle of Tapae, between Trajan and Decebal in 101 winning the Romans
Fourth Battle of Tapae, between Trajan and Decebal in 105 winning the Romans